In molecular biology, the ACT domain is a protein domain that is found in a variety of proteins involved in metabolism. ACT domains are linked to a wide range of metabolic enzymes that are regulated by amino acid concentration. The ACT domain is named after three of the proteins that contain it: aspartate kinase, chorismate mutase and TyrA. The archetypical ACT domain is the C-terminal regulatory domain of 3-phosphoglycerate dehydrogenase (3PGDH), which folds with a ferredoxin-like topology. A pair of ACT domains form an eight-stranded antiparallel sheet with two molecules of allosteric inhibitor serine bound in the interface. Biochemical exploration of a few other proteins containing ACT domains supports the suggestions that these domains contain the archetypical ACT structure.

The ACT domain was discovered by Aravind and Koonin using iterative sequence searches.

References 

Protein domains